Víctor Salas Baños (born 16 June 1980) is a Spanish retired footballer who played as a midfielder.

He amassed Segunda División totals of 208 matches and 17 goals during eight seasons, representing in the competition Sevilla, Almería, Poli Ejido, Castellón and Ponferradina. He appeared in La Liga with the first club.

Football career
Born in Morón de la Frontera, Province of Seville, Salas made his professional debut with hometown club Sevilla FC, playing the full 90 minutes in a 0–2 away loss against Valencia CF on 4 December 1999. He appeared in 19 La Liga games in a relegation-ending season, then contributed with the same figures the following campaign in an immediate promotion.

After two-and-a-half more seasons where he could never impose himself as a starter, Salas moved in January 2004 to Andalusian neighbours UD Almería, in the second division. He then established his career with another side in the region, Polideportivo Ejido, appearing an average of 36 matches (second level also) per season.

Salas moved to CD Castellón in 2007, after his contract with Ejido was not renewed. After two more years in division two, with a poor personal output in his second, he dropped down to the third tier and signed with SD Ponferradina.

Personal life
Salas' nephew Kike is also a footballer. A central defender, he too was groomed at Sevilla.

References

External links

1980 births
Living people
People from Campiña de Morón y Marchena
Sportspeople from the Province of Seville
Spanish footballers
Footballers from Andalusia
Association football midfielders
La Liga players
Segunda División players
Segunda División B players
Tercera División players
Sevilla Atlético players
Sevilla FC players
UD Almería players
Polideportivo Ejido footballers
CD Castellón footballers
SD Ponferradina players
CD Teruel footballers